Nadia Centoni (Barga, 19 June 1981) is an Italian volleyball player. She currently plays for RC Cannes, playing as opposite.

Career
Centoni played with her national team at the 2014 World Championship. There her team ended up in fourth place after losing 2-3 to Brazil the bronze medal match.

Clubs
  Club Italia (1998–1999)
  Teseco Sesto Fiorentino (1999–2000)
  Figurella Firenze (2000–2001)
  Asystel Novara (2001–2002)
  Minetti Infoplus Vicenza (2002–2003)
  Scavolini Pesaro (2003–2005)
  VC Padova (2005–2007)
  RC Cannes (2007–2014)
  Galatasaray (2014–2017)
  RC Cannes (2017–2018)

Awards

Individuals
 2009–10 CEV Champions League "Best Spiker"

Clubs
 2009–10 CEV Champions League —  Bronze medal, with RC Cannes
 2011–12 CEV Champions League —  Runner-Up, with RC Cannes
 2008–14 French Cup —  (7 Titles) Champion, with RC Cannes
 2008–14 French Championship —  (7 Titles) Champion, with RC Cannes
 2016–17 Turkish League —  Runner-Up, with Galatasaray

References

Living people
1981 births
Italian women's volleyball players
Italian expatriate sportspeople in France
Italian expatriate sportspeople in Turkey
Olympic volleyball players of Italy
Volleyball players at the 2004 Summer Olympics
Volleyball players at the 2008 Summer Olympics
Volleyball players at the 2016 Summer Olympics
Galatasaray S.K. (women's volleyball) players
People from Barga, Tuscany
Sportspeople from the Province of Lucca